CW46 may refer to one of current or former The CW Television Network affiliates:
 WBSF Bay City/Saginaw/Flint, Michigan (Affiliate)
 KRNS-CD Reno, Nevada (Affiliate)
 WJZY Former CW affiliate of Belmont/Charlotte, North Carolina (Now Fox Affiliate)